Kill GAA may refer to:

 Kill GAA (County Kildare), a sports club in Kill, County Kildare
 Kill GAA (County Waterford), a sports club in Kill, County Waterford